A hummock is a small knoll or mound above ground.

Hummock may also refer to:

 Bundaberg Hummock, or The Hummock, an extinct volcanic in Queensland, Australia
 Hummock Island, Falkland Islands
 Hummock Lake, Idaho, U.S.
 Hummock Range, South Australia

See also 

 Hammock (disambiguation)
 Tussock (disambiguation)
 Kitts Hummock, Delaware, U.S.
 Moswetuset Hummock, a historic place in Quincy, Massachusetts, U.S.
 Three Hummock Island, Tasmania, Australia
 Three Hummocks Islands, Northern Territory, Australia
 Two Hummock Island, Antarctica
 Hummocky cross-stratification, sedimentary structure found in sandstones
 Hummocks Watchman Eagles Football Club, South Australia